1st AIBA African Olympic Boxing Qualifying Tournament was held from January 23 to January 31, 2008 in Algiers, Algeria.

Qualifying
21 teams participated in this tournament:

 
  
  
 
 
 
 
 
 
 
 
 
 
 
 
 
 
 
 
 
 

Competition System 
The competition system of the 1st AIBA African Olympic Boxing Qualifying Tournament is the knockout round system. Each boxer fights one match per round.

Medal summary

Medal table

Symbol of AIBA

References
1st AIBA African Olympic Boxing Qualifying Tournament

See also
 1st AIBA European 2008 Olympic Qualifying Tournament
 2nd AIBA African 2008 Olympic Qualifying Tournament

 
Qualification for the 2008 Summer Olympics
Boxing at the 2008 Summer Olympics
Boxing in Africa
B
B
Boxing in Algeria
AIBA African 2008 Olympic Qualifying Tournament